The Citadel of Warsaw may refer to:

The Citadel of Warsaw (1930 film), German film
The Citadel of Warsaw (1937 film), German film